Cyclic-guanylate-specific phosphodiesterase (EC 3.1.4.52, cyclic bis(3′→5')diguanylate phosphodiesterase, c-di-GMP-specific phosphodiesterase, c-di-GMP phosphodiesterase, phosphodiesterase, phosphodiesterase A1, PDEA1, VieA) is an enzyme with systematic name cyclic bis(3′→5′)diguanylate 3-guanylylhydrolase. This enzyme catalyses the following reaction:

 cyclic di-3′,5′-guanylate + H2O  5′-phosphoguanylyl(3′→5′)guanosine

This enzyme requires Mg2+ or Mn2+ for activity. It is inhibited by Ca2+ and Zn2+.

References

External links 
 

EC 3.1.4